"22" is a song by American singer-songwriter Taylor Swift, taken from her fourth studio album, Red (2012). It was released as the album's fourth single on March 12, 2013, by Big Machine Records. Written and produced by Swift, Max Martin, and Shellback, "22" combines pop styles such as dance-pop and bubblegum with disco and 1990s rock. The track begins with an acoustic guitar riff and progresses into an upbeat refrain which incorporates pulsing synthesizers and syncopated bass drums. The lyrics celebrate being 22 years old while acknowledging the heartache that the narrator experienced in the past.

Upon Red release, critics complimented the production of "22" as catchy but some found the lyrics weak and the song repetitive. Retrospectively, some have considered it one of Swift's best pop songs. "22" peaked at number 20 on the US Billboard Hot 100 and was certified triple platinum by the Recording Industry Association of America (RIAA). It received platinum or higher certifications in Australia, Canada, and the United Kingdom, peaking in the top 10 on the singles chart in the lattermost country. The accompanying music video was shot in Malibu, California, depicting Swift having a house party with friends. Swift included the song in the set list of the Red Tour (2013–2014) and performed it live at the 2013 Billboard Music Awards.

Some media outlets dub "22" a cultural phenomenon resulting in the prominence of 22nd birthdays. A re-recorded version of "22", titled "22 (Taylor's Version)", was released as part of Swift's second re-recorded album Red (Taylor's Version) on November 12, 2021, by Republic Records. "22 (Taylor's Version)" peaked within the top 40 on singles charts of Australia, Canada, and Singapore; it also peaked at number 52 on the US Billboard Hot 100.

Writing and production
Swift released her third studio album, the self-written Speak Now, in October 2010. Produced by Swift and Nathan Chapman, Speak Now expands on the country-pop production style of its predecessor, Fearless (2008). On her fourth studio album, Red (2012), Swift wanted to experiment with other musical styles. To this end, she worked with producers outside of her career base in Nashville, Tennessee, and went to Los Angeles to collaborate with Swedish producer Max Martin. Swift cited Martin's ability to "just land a chorus" as an inspiration.

Martin and Shellback, another Swedish producer, co-wrote and co-produced three songs with Swift on Red—"22", "We Are Never Ever Getting Back Together", and "I Knew You Were Trouble"—all of which feature a pop production and programmed keyboards. Michael Ilbert and Sam Holland recorded "22" at MXM Studios in Stockholm and Conway Recording Studios in Los Angeles, with engineers John Hanes, Eric Eylands, and Tim Roberts. Şerban Ghenea mixed "22" at MixStar Studios in Virginia Beach. The instruments used on the track include acoustic guitar (Swift, Shellback), bass (Shellback), electric guitar (Shellback), and keyboards (Martin, Shellback).

Talking about the theme of "22", Swift told Billboard that the song captures how she felt about being 22 years old and the "possibilities of how you're still learning, but you know enough. [...] That brings about a carefree feeling that is sort of based on in-decision and fear and at the same time letting loose". She said during a February 2013 interview with Ryan Seacrest that the song's inspiration was a group of female friends with whom she often hung out; despite the uncertainty of adulthood, "the one thing that you have is that you have each other". On March 12, 2013, Big Machine in partnership with Republic Records released "22" to US contemporary hit radio as the fourth Red single. A day later, it was released exclusively to Swift's official website as a limited-edition CD single, which was sold by itself or via an exclusive package with the Red Tour merchandise. "22" was released in the United Kingdom on March 31, 2013.

Composition and lyrics

Music critics described "22" as a pop song incorporating styles such as bubblegum and dance-pop. Rob Sheffield from Rolling Stone described the genre as disco, and Annie Zaleski in the Cleveland Scene called the track a "spunky '90s-rock gem". "22" begins with an acoustic guitar riff and incorporates an acoustic guitar-based arrangement in the verses. The upbeat refrain infuses elements of dance and electronic music; it incorporates pulsing 1980s-pop-influenced synthesizers and syncopated bass drums that evoke influences from hip hop and alternative rock. Billboard said "22" was Swift's "most blatantly 'pop' song" up to that point, and Perone commented that her vocals, processed by Martin's and Shellback's electronic production, make the track sound radically different compared to her previous songs. According to The Boot's Riane Konc, despite the pop production, "22" remains "[an] essential part of [Swift's] country years".

In the lyrics, the narrator celebrates the experience of being 22 years old, inviting friends to dress up, hang out, and "make fun of [their] exes" after having gone through a heartbreak. When she and the friends are at the party, she realizes the place has "too many cool kids" (who murmur, "‘Who's Taylor Swift anyway, ew?"). The group then decides to "ditch the whole scene". Towards the song's conclusion, the narrator dances with a man who "looks like bad news", but whom she "has to have".

Critics observed the conflicting emotions of early adulthood. Jordan Sargent of Spin said the refrain's bass has a "fleeting upward sweep" that reflects the lyrical sentiment of "feeling young and invincible" while facing the impending "doom of growing up". For Billboard, although the production is upbeat with "the most sugary hooks available", the lyrics are rather contemplative. NPR Music's J. English wrote that the contradictory feelings ("We're happy, free, confused and lonely at the same time / It's miserable and magical") serve as a mission statement for Red depiction of a wide array of emotions, from the wide-eyed optimism on "Begin Again" to the cautionary tale of celebrity on "The Lucky One". Perone otherwise found the track to be escapist and carefree; whereas the narrators of Swift's previous songs ponder about lost love in her own headspace, the narrator of "22" hangs out at parties and gets along with a man she just met.

Critical reception

Billboard review of Red appreciated Swift's songwriting on "22" for "succinctly communicating conflicting emotion" despite the upbeat production. Digital Spy's Lewis Corner deemed the single another "pop smash" for Swift's career. Reviewers that highlighted "22" as one of the album's best tracks included Idolator's Sam Lansky, USA Today Jerry Shriver, and the Tampa Bay Times Max Asayesh-Brown, all of whom complimented the production. Mesfin Fekadu of the Associated Press found it better than the lead single "We Are Never Ever Getting Back Together" but deemed the lyrics weak. Some viewed the song as derivative of the chart hits by Swift's contemporaries such as Katy Perry and Kesha, including The Boston Globe's James Reed, Telegram & Gazette Craig S. Semon, and Slant Magazine Jonathan Keefe, who labelled it as a "shrill, deliberately vapid  knockoff". AllMusic's Stephen Thomas Erlewine dubbed it a "cheerfully ludicrous club-filler".

At the 2015 Pop Awards held by Broadcast Music, Inc., "22" was one of the three songs (with "Everything Has Changed" and "Shake It Off") that helped Swift earn recognition as one of the "Songwriters of the Year". Retrospective reviews have been generally positive, with welcoming comments from Lansky, who highlighted the "millennial pink fizz" and "neutered naughtiness", and Sheffield, who said the song is "[approximately] 22,000 times more fun than actually being 22". Nate Jones from Vulture hailed "22" for simultaneously being "absurdly catchy" and having "enough personality", and Nick Levine from Time Out's deemed it "far smarter" than an average dance-pop song. In a 2019 ranking of Swift's 44 singles, The Guardian Alexis Petridis placed the song at number four, and lauded its catchiness and contemplative lyrics about early adulthood. Perone nonetheless deemed "22" not as sophisticated and grounded as Swift's previous songs about heartbreak, specifically "Fifteen" (2009).

Some media publications dubbed "22" a cultural phenomenon resulting in the prominence of 22nd birthdays; according to NME Hannah Mylrea, "Before '22' nobody cared when you celebrated your 22nd birthday [...] and somehow Swift turned it into a milestone."

Commercial performance
For the week ending October 28, 2012, "22" debuted at number 44 on the US Billboard Hot 100 and number seven on Hot Digital Songs with first-week sales of 108,000 digital copies; it was the week's highest debut position. After its single release, the song peaked at number 20 on the Billboard Hot 100 and was the sixth track from Red to reach the top 20. The Recording Industry Association of America (RIAA) certified the single triple platinum, denoting three million track-equivalent units based on digital sales and streaming. In the United Kingdom, "22" peaked at number nine on the UK Singles Chart and was certified platinum by the British Phonographic Industry (BPI). The single also received sales certifications in Australia (double platinum), Canada (platinum), New Zealand (gold), and Japan (gold), and peaked within the top 30 in the first three countries.

Music video and live performances

Swift travelled to Malibu, California, in February 2013, and filmed the music video for "22" there a day after she attended the 55th Annual Grammy Awards. She premiered the video on March 13, 2013, on Good Morning America. Directed by Anthony Mandler, the video for "22" departs from the narrative-driven video for Swift's previous single, "I Knew You Were Trouble"; it features scenes of Swift and her friends baking in the kitchen, sunbathing on the beach, bouncing on trampolines, and throwing a house party which ends with Swift diving into the pool, clothes on. Some media publications noticed Swift's fashion as hipster-inspired, particularly her chambray shirt and plastic glasses, while Cosmopolitan and Entertainment Weekly deemed the aesthetics reminiscent of Instagram's.

"22" was part of the set list to Swift's private concert held on a péniche on the Seine on January 28, 2013. Her first televised performance of "22" was on May 19, 2013, at the Billboard Music Awards. Dressed in silver shoes, black high-waisted shorts, and a unicorn T-shirt saying "Haters Gonna Hate", Swift sang the first verse and chorus, and the second verse in the dressing room backstage. She appeared onstage for the rest of the song, joined by America's Got Talent winners and the dance crew Jabbawockeez; the performances ended with red balloons falling from the ceiling. The song was part of the set list to the Red Tour (2013–2014), where Swift performed it with a dance troupe.

Swift later included "22" as part of the set lists to her other concerts and shows, including at the iHeartRadio Music Festival in September 2014, at the Formula 1 United States Grand Prix at the Circuit of the Americas in October 2016, and at the DirecTV Super Saturday Night, as part of a series of pre-Super Bowl concerts, in February 2017. She performed "22" on the Reputation Stadium Tour (2018) as a "surprise song" for the second show in Chicago, the first show in Foxborough, and the show in Sydney. On December 8, 2019, Swift performed the song at Capital FM's Jingle Bell Ball 2019 in London.

Swift included "22" on the set list of the Eras Tour (2023).

Credits and personnel
Adapted from Red album liner notes
 Taylor Swift – vocals, songwriter, acoustic guitar
 Max Martin – producer, songwriter, keyboards
 Shellback – producer, songwriter, acoustic guitar, electric guitar, keyboards, bass, programming
 Tom Coyne – mastering
 Eric Eylands – assistant recording
 Şerban Ghenea – mixing
 John Hanes – engineer
 Sam Holland – recording
 Michael Ilbert – recording
 Tim Roberts – assistant mixing

Charts

Weekly charts

Year-end charts

Certifications

"22 (Taylor's Version)"

Swift re-recorded of "22" for her second re-recorded album, Red (Taylor's Version). She posted a snippet of the re-recorded song, titled "22 (Taylor's Version)", on her Instagram on August 5, 2021. Red (Taylor's Version) was released on November 12, 2021, by Republic Records; it is part of Swift's move to claim the ownership to her master recordings after a public dispute with her former label Big Machine and talent manager Scooter Braun.

"22 (Taylor's Version)" was produced by Swift, Shellback, and Christopher Rowe. In reviews of Red (Taylor's Version), some critics remarked that "22" was one of Swift's best pop songs, with Olivia Horn from Pitchfork deeming it one of her "great masterpieces". In Slant Magazine, Jonathan Keefe commented that though the 2012 version was indiscernible from the music of other pop stars of the era, the 2021 re-recorded version improved with a wistful tone.

"22 (Taylor's Version)" peaked within the top 40 of singles charts in Australia, Canada, and Singapore. It peaked at number 52 on the US Billboard Hot 100 and number 30 on the Billboard Global 200.

Personnel
Adapted from Red (Taylor's Version) album liner notes

 Taylor Swift – lead vocals, background vocals, songwriter, producer
 Christopher Rowe – producer, lead vocals engineer
 Shellback – producer, songwriter
 Max Martin – songwriter
 Dan Burns – additional programming, additional engineer
 Matt Billingslea – drums
 Bryce Bordone – engineer
 Derek Garten – engineer, editor
 Şerban Ghenea – mixer
 Max Bernstein – synths
 Mike Meadows – acoustic guitar, synths
 Amos Heller – bass guitar, bass synthesizer
 Paul Sidoti – electric guitar

Charts

Release history

References

Sources
 

2013 singles
2012 songs
Taylor Swift songs
Songs written by Taylor Swift
Songs written by Max Martin
Songs written by Shellback (record producer)
Big Machine Records singles
Republic Records singles
Music videos directed by Anthony Mandler
Song recordings produced by Max Martin
Song recordings produced by Shellback (record producer)
Song recordings produced by Taylor Swift
Song recordings produced by Chris Rowe
Songs about dancing
Bubblegum pop songs
American disco songs